Wandina is an outer southern suburb of Geraldton, Western Australia. Its local government area is the City of Greater Geraldton.

The suburb was gazetted in 1985.

Geography
Wandina is located at the southern extremity of Geraldton's metropolitan area, and extends south-southeast from Mount Tarcoola along the eastern side of Brand Highway.

Demographics

Wandina residents had a median age of 32, and median incomes were above-average for the region — $651 per week compared with $461 per week. Key occupations of Wandina residents (2001) were retail (17%), property and business services, education, personal services and construction. The population of Wandina was predominantly Australian-born - 82.9% as at the 2001 census - while 4.70% were born in the United Kingdom. 6.37% reported one or more parents of Italian birth.

References

Suburbs of Geraldton